Our Lady of the Pillar of Imus (Spanish: Nuestra Señora del Pilar de Imus) is a venerated image of the Madonna and Child atop a pillar venerated in Imus, Philippines. It is enshrined in the cathedral as the patroness of the Diocese of Imus.

The image was granted a canonical coronation by Pope Benedict XVI via a pontifical decree in 2011. The coronation was executed on 3 December 2012 in celebration of the golden jubilee of the Diocese of Imus as decreed by Pope John XXIII via his papal bull "Chisti Fidelis".

History
There is no strong evidence that proves the authenticity of the image. The image portrays "Virgen de Consolacion" but to follow the tradition, our lady is called "del pilar". During the coronation, the imaged crowned was the replica, not the original image.

Imus was formed part of the Hacienda de Imus owned by the Recollect Fathers in 1686. These include the Encomienda de Binakayan (Binakayan, Kawit) and Perez Dasmariñas (Dasmariñas) which is a former barrio of Imus.

Like Cavite City (originally called Cavite La Punta) and Noveleta, Cavite (La Tierra Alta), the Hacienda de Imus (now Imus) used to be a barrio of Cavite el Viejo (now Kawit, Cavite), whose parish church was built by the Jesuits during the administration of Manila archbishop Garcia Serrano from 1618 to 1629. For more than a century and a half the people of Imus had to endure walking or traveling 4.5 kilometers of dirt road to attend religious services or transact official business in Cavite el Viejo. The difficulty of communication between Imus and Kawit was long-standing complaint of the Imuseños until another religious order, the Order of Augustinian Recollects, as a consequence to the British occupation of Manila in 1762, established a parish church in Imus, in what now known as Bayang Luma (now Bayanluma).

However, the church was far from the estate house acquired by the Recollect corporation, and when the church was destroyed by a strong typhoon in September 1779, the Recollect friars transferred it to Barrio Toclong and then finally to Sitio de Balangon, now the present site of the church.

In 1769, the workers of the hacienda together with the cabezas de barangay completed the relocation of their houses into a reduccion. The reduccion was a process of resetting the people near the church called Bajo de Campanas to facilitate the evangelization of the people and also to put them under the control of the Spanish authority. The people who refused to live within the reduccion were called taong labas which often had the connotation of being lawless people.

With the establishment of the Recollect church the people of Imus gained their religious emancipation from the Jesuit-run parish of Cavite el Viejo. The Recollects, however, would not be contented with the little victory. In 1774, Racollect Fary Pedro San Buenaventure, ORSA, petitioned the government to "separate the inquilinos of Imus from the political jurisdiction of the government of Cavite el Viejo". After a considerable time of waiting, the petition was granted and Imus became an independent municipality on 3 October 1795 (nine days before the Feast of Nuestra Señora del Pilar).

Canonical coronation
Pope Benedict XVI acknowledged the petition of the miracles claimed by devotees in 2011, authorizing the coronation of the image via a papal bull. The canonical coronation was carried out on 3 December 2012 in Imus Cathedral by Luis Antonio Cardinal Tagle in celebration of the golden jubilee of the diocese.

References

External links
 

Shrines to the Virgin Mary
Titles of Mary
Catholic Church in the Philippines
Religion in Cavite
Imus
Statues of the Madonna and Child